Pontibacillus yanchengensis is a Gram-positive, moderately halophilic and aerobic bacterium from the genus of Pontibacillus which has been isolated from soil from the Sanwei salt field from Yancheng in China.

References

Further reading 
 

 

Bacillaceae
Bacteria described in 2011